Nischan Daimer (born Nischan Tsamonikyan on 19 July 1967 in Leningrad, Soviet Union) is a retired male race walker who competed internationally for Germany. He was affiliated with OSC Münchener Sportclub during his career. He represented Germany at the 1996 Olympic Games (finishing 15th over 20 km) and also competed at the 1995 World Championships in Athletics, where he was twelfth place in the men's 20 km.

Achievements

References

sports-reference
IAAF Fact & Figures

1967 births
Living people
German male racewalkers
Athletes (track and field) at the 1996 Summer Olympics
Olympic athletes of Germany
World Athletics Championships athletes for Germany
Russian sportspeople of Armenian descent
German people of Armenian descent
Athletes from Saint Petersburg